Eunidia is a genus of longhorn beetles of the subfamily Lamiinae.

Species
The genus contains the following species:

 Eunidia adlbaueri Téocchi, Sudre & Jiroux, 2010
 Eunidia affinis Breuning, 1939
 Eunidia albescens Breuning, 1939
 Eunidia albicans Breuning, 1939
 Eunidia alboapicalis Breuning,
 Eunidia albolineata Breuning, 1959
 Eunidia albolineatipennis Breuning, 1968
 Eunidia albonotata Pic, 1933
 Eunidia albopicta Breuning, 1939
 Eunidia albopubens Hunt & Breuning, 1957
 Eunidia albosignata Breuning, 1972
 Eunidia alboterminata Breuning, 1960
 Eunidia alboterminatoides Breuning, 1977
 Eunidia albovariegata Breuning, 1960
 Eunidia allardi Breuning, 1964
 Eunidia alternata Aurivillius, 1911
 Eunidia andamanica Breuning, 1939
 Eunidia angolana Lepesme, 1953
 Eunidia annulata Aurivillius, 1924
 Eunidia annulicornis Breuning, 1953
 Eunidia anteflava Lepesme & Breuning, 1953
 Eunidia apicalis Aurivillius, 1907
 Eunidia apicefusca Breuning, 1939
 Eunidia apicemaculata Breuning, 1939
 Eunidia arabensis Breuning, 1969
 Eunidia argentea Sudre & Téocchi, 2002
 Eunidia aspersa Gahan, 1904
 Eunidia atripes Breuning, 1960
 Eunidia aureicollis Breuning, 1976
 Eunidia auricollis Breuning, 1957
 Eunidia batesi Olliff, 1889
 Eunidia bella Breuning, 1942
 Eunidia bicolor Gardner, 1936
 Eunidia bicoloripennis Breuning, 1974
 Eunidia bifasciata Aurivillius, 1911  
 Eunidia bifuscoplagiata Breuning, 1954
 Eunidia bigriseovittata Breuning, 1962
 Eunidia biplagiata Aurivillius, 1925
 Eunidia bituberata Breuning, 1939
 Eunidia boafoi Breuning, 1978
 Eunidia bremeri Breuning, 1981
 Eunidia breuningiae Villiers, 1951
 Eunidia brunneopunctata Aurivillius, 1911
 Eunidia brunneovittata Breuning, 1939
 Eunidia brunneovittipennis Breuning, 1954
 Eunidia caffra Fahraeus, 1872
 Eunidia camerunica Téocchi, Sudre & Jiroux, 2010
 Eunidia castanoptera Aurivillius, 1920
 Eunidia ceylanica Thomson, 1868
 Eunidia clarkeana Breuning, 1977
 Eunidia clarkei Breuning, 1974
 Eunidia coiffaiti Breuning, 1977
 Eunidia conradti Breuning, 1960
 Eunidia cordifera Aurivillius, 1914
 Eunidia crassicornis Breuning, 1954
 Eunidia cruciata Aurivillius, 1925
 Eunidia cyanoptera Aurivillius, 1910
 Eunidia cylindrica Breuning, 1939
 Eunidia cylindricollis Breuning, 1953
 Eunidia deceptrix Aurivillius, 1925
 Eunidia delkeskampi Breuning, 1960
 Eunidia densealbosparsa Breuning, 1954
 Eunidia dilacerata Aurivillius, 1925
 Eunidia discobivittata Breuning, 1939
 Eunidia discomaculata Breuning, 1940
 Eunidia discounivittata Breuning, 1953
 Eunidia discovittata Breuning, 1939
 Eunidia diversimembris Breuning, 1969
 Eunidia divisa (Pascoe, 1864)
 Eunidia djiboutiana Breuning, 1974
 Eunidia dolosa (Pascoe, 1859)
 Eunidia dolosoides Téocchi, Jiroux & Sudre, 2004
 Eunidia duffyana Breuning, 1957
 Eunidia duffyi Breuning, 1957
 Eunidia duplicata (Pascoe, 1864)
 Eunidia endroedyi Breuning, 1981
 Eunidia euzonata Gahan, 1904
 Eunidia exigua Aurivillius, 1907
 Eunidia fallaciosa Breuning, 1939
 Eunidia fasciata Gahan, 1904 
 Eunidia femoralis Aurivillius, 1907
 Eunidia flava Breuning, 1952
 Eunidia flavicans Breuning, 1954
 Eunidia flavicollis Breuning, 1942
 Eunidia flavoapicata Breuning, 1939
 Eunidia flavointerruptovittata Breuning, 1969
 Eunidia flavomarmorata Breuning, 1939
 Eunidia flavoornata Breuning, 1981
 Eunidia flavopicta Breuning, 1939
 Eunidia flavosignata Breuning, 1939
 Eunidia flavovariegata Breuning, 1961
 Eunidia flavovittata Breuning, 1938
 Eunidia forticornis Breuning, 1943
 Eunidia fulvescens Breuning, 1976
 Eunidia fulvida (Pascoe, 1856)
 Eunidia fusca Breuning, 1953
 Eunidia fuscoapicalis Breuning, 1939
 Eunidia fuscoapicipennis Breuning, 1967
 Eunidia fuscomaculata Breuning, 1939
 Eunidia fuscomarmorata Breuning, 1962
 Eunidia fuscosignata Breuning, 1954
 Eunidia fuscostictica Breuning, 1939
 Eunidia fuscovittata Breuning, 1939
 Eunidia fuscovitticollis Breuning, 1958
 Eunidia ghanaensis Breuning, 1977
 Eunidia griseitarsis Breuning, 1970
 Eunidia griseolineata Breuning, 1939
 Eunidia guttulata (Coquerel, 1851)
 Eunidia haplotrita Aurivillius, 1911
 Eunidia holoflava Breuning, 1965
 Eunidia holofusca Breuning, 1977
 Eunidia holonigra Breuning, 1954
 Eunidia holorufa Breuning, 1977
 Eunidia hovorkai Téocchi, Jiroux & Sudre, 2004
 Eunidia idactiformis Breuning, 1954
 Eunidia indistincta Breuning, 1939
 Eunidia infirma Breuning, 1939
 Eunidia infuscata Breuning, 1939
 Eunidia jeanneli Breuning, 1939
 Eunidia joveri Lepesme & Breuning, 1953
 Eunidia kinduensis Breuning, 1948
 Eunidia kivuana Breuning, 1952
 Eunidia kivuensis Breuning, 1948
 Eunidia kristenseni Aurivillius, 1911
 Eunidia laosensis Breuning, 1964
 Eunidia lateralis Gahan, 1893
 Eunidia lateraloides Breuning, 1963
 Eunidia laterialba Breuning, 1948
 Eunidia lerouxi Téocchi & Sudre, 2002
 Eunidia lindblomi Aurivillius, 1925
 Eunidia lineata Aurivillius, 1911
 Eunidia lineatoides Breuning, 1942
 Eunidia lizleri Téocchi & Sudre, 2002
 Eunidia lomii Breuning, 1938
 Eunidia lubumbashii Breuning, 1976
 Eunidia lujai Breuning, 1951
 Eunidia lycas Breuning, 1981
 Eunidia macrophtalma Breuning, 1940
 Eunidia maculiventris Thomson, 1868
 Eunidia major Breuning, 1977
 Eunidia marmorea Fairmaire, 1892
 Eunidia mediomaculata Breuning, 1938
 Eunidia mediomaculatoides Breuning, 1981
 Eunidia mediosignata Breuning, 1939
 Eunidia mehli Holzschuh, 1986
 Eunidia meleagris Aurivillius, 1926
 Eunidia microphthalma Breuning, 1957
 Eunidia mimica Jordan, 1903
 Eunidia minima Breuning, 1942
 Eunidia minimoides Breuning, 1965
 Eunidia minor Breuning, 1954
 Eunidia mirei Breuning, 1967
 Eunidia mombasae Breuning, 1983
 Eunidia mourgliae Breuning & Téocchi, 1983
 Eunidia mucorea Gahan, 1898
 Eunidia multialboguttata Breuning, 1957
 Eunidia multinigromaculata Breuning, 1967
 Eunidia mussardi Lepesme & Breuning, 1957
 Eunidia naviauxi Villiers, 1977
 Eunidia nebulosa Erichson, 1843
 Eunidia nigeriae Breuning, 1950
 Eunidia nigricans Breuning, 1942
 Eunidia nigroapicalis (Pic, 1925)
 Eunidia nigroapicaloides Breuning, 1976
 Eunidia nigrolateralis Breuning, 1954
 Eunidia nigrosignata Breuning, 1939
 Eunidia nigroterminata Breuning, 1949
 Eunidia nigrovittata Breuning, 1939
 Eunidia nigrovittipennis Breuning, 1961
 Eunidia obliquealbovittata Hunt & Breuning, 1957
 Eunidia obliquealbovittatoides Breuning, 1986
 Eunidia obliqueflavovittata Breuning, 1981
 Eunidia obliquevittata Breuning, 1940
 Eunidia obliquevittipennis Breuning, 1971
 Eunidia obliquevittulipennis Breuning, 1977
 Eunidia ochraceovittata Breuning, 1939
 Eunidia ochreoapicalis Breuning, 1981
 Eunidia ochreomarmorata Breuning, 1939
 Eunidia ochreoornata Breuning, 1970
 Eunidia ochreopicta Breuning, 1964
 Eunidia octoplagiata Breuning, 1955
 Eunidia okahandjae Breuning, 1943
 Eunidia olivacea Breuning, 1954
 Eunidia opima Holzschuh, 1986
 Eunidia ornata Breuning, 1960
 Eunidia pararothkirchi Breuning, 1977
 Eunidia parasenegalensis Breuning, 1977
 Eunidia paraspilota Téocchi, Jiroux & Sudre, 2004
 Eunidia parastrigata Breuning, 1978
 Eunidia partegriseicornis Breuning, 1976
 Eunidia partenigroantennalis Breuning, 1969
 Eunidia partenigrofemoralis Breuning, 1977
 Eunidia philippinarum Aurivillius, 1922
 Eunidia philippinensis Aurivillius, 1922
 Eunidia piperita Gahan, 1898
 Eunidia plagiata Gahan, 1898
 Eunidia postfasciata Breuning, 1947
 Eunidia preapicefasciata Breuning, 1957
 Eunidia propinqua Breuning, 1939
 Eunidia pseudannulicornis Breuning, 1964
 Eunidia pseudocastanoptera Breuning, 1954
 Eunidia pseudodeceptrix Breuning, 1957
 Eunidia pseudosenilis Breuning, 1970
 Eunidia pseudosocia Breuning, 1954
 Eunidia pseudostrigata Breuning, 1977
 Eunidia pulchra Breuning, 1939
 Eunidia punctulicollis Breuning, 1957
 Eunidia pygmaea Fahraeus, 1872
 Eunidia quadrialbosignata Breuning, 1965
 Eunidia quadrialbovittata Breuning, 1961
 Eunidia quadricincta Aurivillius, 1911
 Eunidia quadrivittata Breuning, 1938
 Eunidia quinquemaculata Breuning, 1939
 Eunidia raffrayi Breuning, 1970
 Eunidia renaudi Breuning, 1961
 Eunidia rondoni Breuning, 1962
 Eunidia rothkirchi Breuning, 1954
 Eunidia rougemonti Breuning, 1977
 Eunidia rufa Aurivillius, 1921
 Eunidia rufescens Breuning, 1939
 Eunidia ruficornis Breuning, 1949
 Eunidia rufina Breuning, 1953
 Eunidia rufolineata Breuning, 1939
 Eunidia rufula (Fairmaire, 1905)
 Eunidia rufulicornis Breuning, 1954
 Eunidia rufuloides Breuning, 1939
 Eunidia saucissea Breuning & Téocchi, 1978
 Eunidia savioi (Pic, 1925)
 Eunidia scorteccii Breuning, 1959
 Eunidia scotti Breuning, 1939
 Eunidia semirufa Aurivillius, 1916
 Eunidia setosa Breuning, 1938
 Eunidia sexplagiata Breuning, 1954
 Eunidia similis Breuning, 1942
 Eunidia simplex Gahan, 1890
 Eunidia simplicior Breuning, 1939
 Eunidia somaliensis Breuning, 1948
 Eunidia spilota Gahan, 1904
 Eunidia spilotoides Breuning, 1939
 Eunidia spinicornis (Péringuey, 1888)
 Eunidia splendida Breuning, 1954
 Eunidia stramentosa Breuning, 1939
 Eunidia stramentosipennis Breuning, 1954
 Eunidia strigata Fahraeus, 1872
 Eunidia subalbicans Breuning, 1967
 Eunidia subannulicornis Breuning, 1968
 Eunidia subbifasciata (Heller, 1924)
 Eunidia subfasciata Gahan, 1898
 Eunidia subinfirma Breuning, 1955
 Eunidia subnebulosa Breuning, 1961
 Eunidia subnigra Breuning, 1955
 Eunidia subpygmaea Breuning, 1965
 Eunidia subsimilis Breuning, 1960
 Eunidia subteralba Breuning, 1942
 Eunidia subtergrisea Thomson, 1868
 Eunidia subtesselata Gahan, 1909
 Eunidia subtimida Breuning, 1954
 Eunidia subvagepicta Breuning, 1963
 Eunidia sulphurea Aurivillius, 1925
 Eunidia suturealba Breuning, 1942
 Eunidia suturebrunnea Breuning, 1977
 Eunidia tanzanicola Téocchi & Sudre, 2003
 Eunidia theresae Breuning, 1939
 Eunidia thomensis Breuning, 1970
 Eunidia thomseni Distant, 1898
 Eunidia timida Pascoe, 1864
 Eunidia transversefasciata Breuning & Jong, 1941
 Eunidia transversevittata Breuning, 1940
 Eunidia trialbofasciata Breuning, 1960
 Eunidia tricolor Breuning, 1962
 Eunidia trifasciata Aurivillius, 1923
 Eunidia trifuscopunctata Breuning, 1948
 Eunidia tripunctata Aurivillius, 1911
 Eunidia trivittata Aurivillius, 1927
 Eunidia trivitticollis Téocchi & Sudre, 2002
 Eunidia tubericollis Breuning, 1961
 Eunidia unicolor Breuning, 1950
 Eunidia unicoloricornis Breuning, 1962
 Eunidia unifuscomaculata Breuning, 1960
 Eunidia vagefasciata Breuning, 1955
 Eunidia vagefuscomaculata Breuning, 1969
 Eunidia vageguttata Breuning, 1939
 Eunidia vagemarmorata Breuning, 1954
 Eunidia vagepicta Breuning, 1957
 Eunidia vagevittata Breuning, 1939
 Eunidia vansoni Breuning, 1981
 Eunidia varicoloripennis Breuning, 1969
 Eunidia varicornis Breuning, 1961
 Eunidia variegata (Thomson, 1857)
 Eunidia varipes Breuning, 1950
 Eunidia vestigialis (Pascoe, 1864)
 Eunidia vittata (Pic, 1932)
 Eunidia vitticollis Breuning, 1939
 Eunidia wittei Breuning, 1940
 Eunidia xyliae Gardner, 1941
 Eunidia yemeniensis Breuning, 1968
 Eunidia ziczac Breuning, 1939

References

Eunidiini